Miguel Mejía (born March 25, 1975) is a former Major League Baseball player. He was used as both an outfielder and a pinch runner. He was selected by the Kansas City Royals from the Baltimore Orioles in the Rule 5 draft on December 4, 1995.

References

External links

219 Miguel Mejía OF. St. Louis Cardinals 1996

1975 births
Living people
Albany-Colonie Diamond Dogs players
Albany Polecats players
Bluefield Orioles players
Dominican Republic expatriate baseball players in the United States
Frederick Keys players
High Desert Mavericks players

Major League Baseball players from the Dominican Republic
New Jersey Cardinals players
Prince William Cannons players
St. Louis Cardinals players
St. Petersburg Cardinals players